Rockaway Beach may refer to:

 "Rockaway Beach" (song), by the Ramones
 Rockaway Beach, California
 Rockaway Beach, Missouri
 Rockaway Beach, Oregon
 Rockaway Beach, Wisconsin
 Rockaway Beach, Queens, New York City
 Rockaway Beach and Boardwalk, beach in Queens